Upland or Uplands may refer to:

Geography 
Hill, an area of higher land, generally
Highland, an area of higher land divided into low and high points
Upland and lowland, conditional descriptions of a plain based on elevation above sea level
In limnology and freshwater biology, the terrestrial ecosystems above the high water mark (wetland) of a riparian zone or lakeshore

Places

Australia
 Upland, Queensland, a locality in the Barcaldine Region
 Desert Uplands, a bio-region in Queensland

Canada
 CFB Uplands, a former Canadian Forces Base located in Ottawa, Ontario
 Uplands, Ottawa, a neighbourhood in Ottawa
 Uplands, Greater Victoria, a Vancouver Island neighbourhood in the northeast Oak Bay, British Columbia
 Uplands Park, an undeveloped natural reserve in the Uplands neighbourhood
 Uplands Ski Centre, a ski area in Thornhill, Ontario
 The Uplands, Edmonton, a future neighbourhood
 Uplands, Ontario, a neighbourhood in the City of London, Ontario

Germany
 Upland (mountain range), in Hesse and Westphalia

Norway
 Uplands, Norway, an ancient name for the agricultural lands and forests to the north of Oslo in Norway

South Africa
 Uplands College, a high school near Mpumalanga, South Africa

Sweden
 Uppland, a historical province on the eastern coast of Sweden, including the northern shores of Stockholm, Sweden

United Kingdom
Uplands, Gloucestershire, a location in England
Uplands, Swansea, a suburb and community of Swansea, Wales
Uplands (electoral ward), an electoral ward in Swansea, Wales
Uplands Academy, a secondary school in Wadhurst, East Sussex, England
 Upland Britain, a list of semi-natural habitats

United States
Upland South, the northern part of the Southern United States, in contrast to the Deep South
Upland, California, a city
Upland, Indiana, a town
Indiana Uplands, a geographical region in south-central Indiana
Upland, Kansas, a rural unincorporated community
Upland, Nebraska, a village
Upland, Pennsylvania, a borough
Upland, Texas, a ghost town
Upland, West Virginia (disambiguation)

Other uses
Upland (restaurant), a restaurant in New York City
Upland, a song by Edgar Froese from the album Aqua
Upland (UPL), a wetland indicator status for plants
Upland Brewing Company, a brewery in Bloomington, Indiana
Uplands nation, a student society at Uppsala University, Sweden
Upland cotton, the cultivated Gossypium hirsutum cotton
Uplands Party, a political party that stands candidates in Uplands (electoral ward)

See also
Uplands School (disambiguation)
Uplander (disambiguation)